Emma Kremer (born 28 July 2000) is a Luxembourger footballer who plays as a defender for Dames Ligue 1 club Jeunesse Junglinster and the Luxembourg women's national team.

International career
Kremer made her senior debut for Luxembourg on 3 March 2018 during a 1–7 friendly loss to Morocco.

References

2000 births
Living people
Women's association football defenders
Luxembourgian women's footballers
Luxembourg women's international footballers